David Lawrence Sleeper was a Republican politician in the U.S. state of Ohio who was Speaker of the Ohio House of Representatives 1896-1898.

Biography
David L. Sleeper was born in Iowa on June 15, 1856. He attended Otterbein University in Westerville, Ohio and taught school for five years.

Sleeper graduated from Cincinnati Law School in 1880, and practiced law at Athens, Ohio. From 1885 to 1891 he was prosecuting attorney for Athens County. He was elected to the 71st General Assembly of the Ohio House of Representatives, (1894-1896), as a Republican. He was re-elected to the 72nd General Assembly, (1896-1898), when he was selected by his peers as Speaker.

In 1896, Sleeper moved to Columbus, Ohio, where he practiced law.

David L. Sleeper was married November 7, 1877 to Mary Dell "Della" Burson of Athens County, Ohio. They had five children. He was a Scottish Rite Mason, Elk, and member of the I.O.O.F.

He died suddenly March 31, 1914 of apoplexy, and is buried in Lawton, Oklahoma.

References

Speakers of the Ohio House of Representatives
1856 births
People from Iowa
People from Athens, Ohio
Politicians from Columbus, Ohio
Republican Party members of the Ohio House of Representatives
County district attorneys in Ohio
Otterbein University alumni
University of Cincinnati College of Law alumni
1914 deaths
19th-century American politicians
Lawyers from Columbus, Ohio
19th-century American lawyers